Chico Benymon (born August 7, 1974) is an American actor, singer, musician, and fashion designer best known for his role as Andre "Spencer" Williams on the UPN comedy Half & Half. He also starred in the Nickelodeon TV series The Haunted Hathaways.

Filmography

Studio album
 Don't Talk, Just Listen (Finao Music Group, 2019)

References

External links

Chico Benymon on Myspace

1974 births
Living people
African-American male actors
American male film actors
American male television actors
Male actors from New York (state)
People from Amityville, New York
21st-century African-American people
20th-century African-American people